St. Michael's Church is a historic, wooden chapel of ease in Gierałcice, Kluczbork County in Poland. The church belongs to the Evangelical Church of the Augsburg Confession in Poland.

References

Kluczbork County
Gierałcice